Afroneta altivaga is a species of sheet weaver spider found in the Congo. It was described by Åke Holm of Uppsala University in 1968.

References

Linyphiidae
Fauna of the Democratic Republic of the Congo
Spiders of Africa
Spiders described in 1968